Liu Chunhong (born January 29, 1983, in Yantai, Shandong) is a Chinese weightlifter.

Career
At the 2003 World Weightlifting Championships she won in the 69 kg category with a total of ten new world records and junior world records.

She competed in the 2004 Summer Olympics, and won the gold medal in the 69 kg class.

At the 2007 World Weightlifting Championships she won the snatch competition in the 69 kg category with 121 kg, and won the silver medal lifting in total 271 kg.

At the 2008 Summer Olympics she won the gold medal in the 69 kg category, while setting new Olympic and world records in both the snatch and clean and jerk with a lift of 128 kg and 158 kg respectively for a world record total of 286 kg. This total would have been enough to win gold and set the Olympic record in the 75 kg category (heavyweight) , as well as tie Svetlana Podobedova's then world record in that category. She became the first ever woman to defend her Olympic title in weightlifting.

On 12 January 2017 it was announced that because of a doping violation she had been disqualified from the 2008 Olympic Games.

Personal bests (69 kg)
Snatch: 128 kg (2008 Summer Olympics, disqualified in 2017)
Clean and Jerk: 158 kg (2008 Summer Olympics, disqualified in 2017)
Total: 286 kg (2008 Summer Olympics, disqualified in 2017)

Other
Jerk (off rack): 175 kg (training claim)
Front Squat: 200.0 kg
Back Squat: 230.0 kg (Raw women's 69 kg all-time world record)

References

External links
 
 Chunhong Liu at Athens2004.com 
 
 

1983 births
Living people
Olympic gold medalists for China
Olympic weightlifters of China
Sportspeople from Yantai
Weightlifters at the 2004 Summer Olympics
Weightlifters at the 2008 Summer Olympics
Olympic medalists in weightlifting
Asian Games medalists in weightlifting
Weightlifters from Shandong
Weightlifters at the 2002 Asian Games
Weightlifters at the 2010 Asian Games
Chinese female weightlifters
Doping cases in weightlifting
Chinese sportspeople in doping cases
Medalists at the 2004 Summer Olympics
Asian Games gold medalists for China
Medalists at the 2002 Asian Games
Medalists at the 2010 Asian Games
Competitors stripped of Summer Olympics medals
World Weightlifting Championships medalists
20th-century Chinese women
21st-century Chinese women